Suburbs is an album by the American New wave band The Suburbs, released in 1986. It was their first and only release on A&M Records. The album has never been released on compact disc. It was produced by former Revolution drummer Bobby Z. (credited as Robert Brent).

Reception

Writing for Allmusic, music critic Stewart Mason called the album "inappropriately produced... in a fashion that completely sublimates all of the qualities that had made the quintet so musically interesting in the first place."

Track listing
All songs composed by The Suburbs.
 "Superlove" – 4:29
 "Heart of Gold" – 4:26
 "Every Night's a Friday Night" – 2:59
 "Never Stop (To Say Goodbye)" – 5:58
 "America Sings the Blues" – 3:13
 "#9" – 4:30
 "Life Is Like" – 3:11
 "Want That Girl" – 4:36

Personnel
 Chan Poling – vocals, keyboards
 Beej Chaney – vocals, Beejtar
 Hugo Klaers – drums
 Bruce C. Allen – guitar
 Michael Halliday – bass

Additional musicians
Tom Burnevik – saxophones
Kevin Nord – trumpet, voice tracker
Dusty Cox – saxophone solo on "Heart of Gold"

Production credits
Robert Brent – producer
Jim Nipar – engineer
Kirby Binder – assistant engineer
Mike Rees – mastering
Bruce C. Allen – art direction
Donald Krieger – art direction
Chuck Beeson – art direction
Laurie Schendel Allen – cover photo

References

External links 
Twin/Tone Records: The Suburbs

1986 albums
A&M Records albums
The Suburbs albums